The Commonwealth Youth Programme, also known as CYP, is an international development agency working with young people between the ages of 15 and 29. Part of the Commonwealth Secretariat, CYP is active in the Commonwealth's 54 member countries. CYP has a head office in London with four centres in Africa, Lusaka, Zambia, Asia Chandigarh, India, Caribbean Georgetown, Guyana and Pacific Honiara, Solomon Islands.  Currently there are Four Regional Directors and 16 programme officers plus support staff are working there.

About
The CYP's programme of work is decided mainly by Commonwealth Youth Ministers Meeting. Funded by Commonwealth governments through annual pledges to a voluntary fund, CYP is not a funding agency and does not provide financial support to any other organization.

CYP supports, and is supported by, a body of youth representatives called the Commonwealth Youth Caucus. The Youth Caucus meets at national, regional and pan-Commonwealth level to advise the programme. The Youth Caucus has a seat at Commonwealth Youth Ministers Meeting, and helps to organise the Commonwealth Youth Forum which meets prior to Commonwealth Heads of Government Meeting.

The Programme was supported by Queen Elizabeth II in her role as head of the Commonwealth. Princess Anne visited the Commonwealth Youth Programme Regional Centre for Africa in Lusaka, Zambia, in September 2012 as part of her four-day official visit to the country to mark the Queen's Diamond Jubilee.

In 2017 the Commonwealth Secretariat released a review of the Commonwealth Youth Programme.

Activities
CYP provides government and youth-centred organisations with technical assistance in the areas of:
 Enterprise/vocational training and microcredit
 Youth participation in decision-making and youth policy
 Professionalisation and training for youth workers
 Citizenship, peace-building, and human rights education
 HIV/AIDS awareness and counselling
 Information and Communications Technology
 Democracy (through Commonwealth election observer missions)
 Youth mainstreaming
 Youth Development Index

Scope
All of CYP's work falls within The Plan of Action for Youth Empowerment (2007-2015), which is the Commonwealth's organising framework for cooperation on youth affairs. Through the Plan of Action, Commonwealth Heads of Government have affirmed that: "empowering young people means creating and supporting the enabling conditions under which young people can act on their own behalf, and on their own terms, rather than at the direction of others."

CYP's mission statement states that "CYP works to engage and empower young people (aged 15-29) to enhance their contribution to development. We do this in partnership with young people, governments and other key stakeholders. Our mission is grounded within a rights-based approach, guided by the realities facing young people in the Commonwealth, and anchored in the belief that young people are: 
 A force for peace, democracy, equality and good governance
 A catalyst for global consensus building; and 
 An essential resource for sustainable development and poverty eradication.

CYP advocates the effective participation of young women and men in the development process and for social transformation. We value their full engagement at all levels of decision-making."

Youth Awards
The Commonwealth Youth Awards for Excellence in Development Work celebrate the contribution of young people to achieving global development goals. The awards, presented to Commonwealth citizens aged 15–29, showcase the work of outstanding young people who are leading initiatives ranging from poverty alleviation to peace building.

Each year an outstanding entrant is named Commonwealth Young Person of the Year, with regional awards given for Asia, the Pacific, the Caribbean and Americas, Africa and Europe. The awards demonstrate to leaders and other policy-makers the importance of young people’s role in development. The awards also serve to inspire other young people to take action in their communities.

Development work can be within any number of areas, such as skills training, arts and culture, environment protection, education, health and well-being, human rights, technology, sport, science and many more areas.

The Awards Programme added a new region to give more visibility to young people across the commonwealth.

For the 2022 Awards, to mark the celebration of the Platinum Jubilee of Elizabeth II, Head of The Commonwealth, The Queen's Commonwealth Trust (QCT) has joined as a partner to offer to a selected applicant two years of flexible funding of £20,000 a year, as well as coaching opportunities and organisational development support.

Partners
The Commonwealth Youth Programme works in partnership with a range of organisations including
 Commonwealth of Learning
 Commonwealth Foundation
 Commonwealth Youth Exchange Council
 Royal Commonwealth Society 
 Commonwealth Policy and Studies Unit
 UN (UNICEF, UN Youth Unit, UNAIDS, UN Habitat, UNDP, UNESCO and UNFPA)
 CARICOM
 47 Partner Universities delivering Youth Work qualifications 
 A range of microcredit NGOs and development banks
 The Body Shop of Australia

References
 Commonwealth Youth Programme Strategic Plan 2006-2008, Commonwealth Secretariat
 Commonwealth Plan of Action for Youth Empowerment 2007-2015, Commonwealth Secretariat

External links
The Commonwealth Secretariat
Ninth Commonwealth Youth Forum 2013 :The youth identity; the Sri Lankan way
CHOGM in South Asia after 30 years: A great milestone in capacity building of Lanka’s youth skills
 CHOGM 2013 in Sri Lanka: The Youth Parliamentary concept of Sri Lanka by M.H.M.N. Bandara https://web.archive.org/web/20131004215431/http://www.sundayobserver.lk/2013/09/15/fea01.asp
 

Institutions of the Commonwealth of Nations
Youth rights organizations
Ageism